is a social simulation video game for the GameCube developed by Marvelous Interactive. The updated GameCube version was released in the United States by Natsume on March 28, 2006. 

For the game's European release, Rising Star Games created an updated version for the GameCube's successor, the Wii. The Wii version was released on March 14, 2008 in European countries, and on April 3, 2008 in Australia. The Wii version of the game was also released in North America on August 25, 2009. The game was not released on the Wii in Japan. The Wii version in all territories added motion-sensitive controls for actions such as fishing, mining and foraging but removed the option to play as a female character.

Besides Yasuhiro Wada, Harvest Moon: Magical Melody is the first entry without the involvement of the main developers from Victor Interactive Software.

Gameplay
The game has two main objectives: to wake the Harvest Goddess and to marry one of the townspeople. The player must gather musical notes by finishing various chores and milestones. These tasks are not revealed to the player aside from hints the player can gather based on the name of the notes in the Notes screen of the pause menu. Some are very obvious, such as the Second House note, but others are less obvious such as the Treasure Hoard note. Collecting at least fifty out of a total of one hundred notes lets the player create the titular magical melody that will revive the village's protectress. This does not end the game, which allows the player to continue collecting even more notes and building relationships with the townspeople. The player can choose to be either a male or female character in the GameCube version. Each gender has a choice of ten potential spouses of the opposite sex, along with the androgynous rival Jamie who is eligible for either player gender. The player can have children, own a house and land, and mine, fish, and farm across four seasons. The game includes several minigames in which up to four players can test their skills. Players unlock some minigames through gameplay, such as unlocking the swimming minigame after attending the Beach Festival and unlocking the horse race minigame after participating in a horse race in the main game.

Story
The Harvest Goddess has turned herself to stone out of melancholy at the townspeople's disregard and a farmer named Jamie is determined to save her. A year later, a new rancher comes to Flowerbud Village, where Theodore, the town's mayor, helps set up their farm. The protagonist also meets the Harvest Sprites, who request their help in reawakening the Harvest Goddess by collecting magical music notes. Jamie becomes rivals with the protagonist. As the protagonist works at the farm, they also meet various people, some which are returning characters from Back to Nature, Save the Homeland, and A Wonderful Life, and makes an effort to befriend and help them. In the end, the Harvest Goddess is revived and Jamie leaves in shame. The protagonist then marries one of the bachelors or bachelorettes and has a child (if they choose to marry Jamie, then they will both leave town, ending the game). Once all the notes are found, Jamie is devastated, but the Goddess encourages him to be more selfless, ending his rivalry with the protagonist.

Reception

The GameCube version received "favorable" reviews, while the Wii version received "average" reviews, according to the review aggregation website Metacritic. In Japan, Famitsu gave the original Shiawase no Uta a score of 31 out of 40, while Famitsu Cube gave its updated version a score of two eights and two sevens for a total of 30 out of 40.

References

External links

Official Bokujō Monogatari website 

2005 video games
GameCube games
Marvelous Entertainment
Natsume (company) games
Magical Melody
Video games developed in Japan
Video games featuring protagonists of selectable gender
Wii games
Rising Star Games games
Multiplayer and single-player video games